Kathrine Kubicki Nissen (born 6 April 1994) is a Danish handball player for Horsens HK.

References 
 

Danish female handball players
1994 births
Living people